The 2016 Air Force Falcons football team represented the United States Air Force Academy during the 2016 NCAA Division I FBS football season. The Falcons were led by tenth-year head coach Troy Calhoun and played their home games at Falcon Stadium. They were members of the Mountain West Conference in the Mountain Division. They finished the season 10–3, 5–3 in Mountain West play to finish in a tie for fourth place in the Mountain Division. They were invited to the Arizona Bowl where they defeated South Alabama.

Schedule
Air Force is to play Boise State, Colorado State and Hawaii at home and Fresno State, San Jose State, Utah State and Wyoming on the road, but the official dates and kickoff times are scheduled to be released within the coming weeks of February 2016.

Schedule Source:

Coaching staff

Game summaries

Abilene Christian

Georgia State

at Utah State

Navy

at Wyoming

vs New Mexico

Hawaii

at Fresno State

at Army

Colorado State

at San Jose State

Boise State

This marked the first time since Nevada, Air Force has beaten Boise State three straight years

vs. South Alabama–Arizona Bowl

References

Air Force
Air Force Falcons football seasons
Arizona Bowl champion seasons
Air Force Falcons football